The yellow-bellied tyrannulet (Ornithion semiflavum) is a species of bird in the family Tyrannidae. It is found in Belize, Costa Rica, Guatemala, Honduras, Mexico, and Nicaragua. Its natural habitats are subtropical or tropical moist lowland forest and heavily degraded former forest.

References

yellow-bellied tyrannulet
Birds of Central America
yellow-bellied tyrannulet
yellow-bellied tyrannulet
yellow-bellied tyrannulet
Taxonomy articles created by Polbot